The 2010–11 Atlas season was the 64th professional season of Mexico's top-flight football league. The season is split into two tournaments—the Torneo Apertura and the Torneo Clausura—each with identical formats and each contested by the same eighteen teams. Atlas began their season on July 25, 2010 against Morelia.

Torneo Aperura

Squad

Season results

Regular season

Goalscorers

Results

Results summary

Results by round

Torneo Clausura

Squad 

Out on loan:

Season results

Regular season

Goalscorers

Results

Results summary

Results by round

References 

2010–11 Primera División de México season
Mexican football clubs 2010–11 season
2010